KBHS (1420 AM) is a Regional Mexican radio station serving and licensed to Hot Springs, Arkansas, United States. The station is currently owned by La Zeta 957 Inc.

References

External links

Regional Mexican radio stations in the United States
BHS
Radio stations established in 1966